Tennis competitions at the 2013 Games of the Small States of Europe was held from May 28 to June 1 at the Stade Josy Barthel, Luxembourg.

Medal summary

Medal table

Medal events

References

External links
Site of the 2013 Games of the Small States of Europe
Result book

 
Games of the Small States of Europe
2013 Games of the Small States of Europe
2013